The Film Producers Guild was a collective of documentary film companies in England. It was formed in August 1944 and had offices and screening facilities on Upper St. Martin's Lane, in London. They owned Merton Park Studios in south London.

Guild producers, directors, writers, cameramen and film editors were part of the British post-war Documentary Film Movement. Peter Morley got his first job in the industry working as a projectionist at the Guild's screening room and met people like Humphrey Jennings, John Grierson, Jill Craigie and Paul Rotha.

Guild film companies 
 Verity Films
 Technical & Scientific Films
 Greenpark Productions

See also 
 List of film distributors in the United Kingdom

References

External links 
 Film Producers Guild Worldcat.org

Film production companies of the United Kingdom
Documentary film organizations